is a sub-kilometer asteroid on a highly eccentric orbit, classified as a near-Earth object of the Apollo group, approximately  in diameter. It was first observed on 14 April 2018, by astronomers with the Catalina Sky Survey one day prior to its sub-lunar close encounter with Earth at 0.5 lunar distance. It is one of the largest known asteroids (possibly the largest) in observational history to ever pass that close to Earth (also see list).

Orbit and classification 

 is a member of the near-Earth population of asteroids known as Apollos. Apollo asteroids cross the orbit of Earth and are the largest group of near-Earth objects with nearly 10 thousand known members. Based on an observation arc of 4 days, it orbits the Sun at a distance of 0.3–3.4 AU once every 2 years and 6 months (918 days; semi-major axis of 1.85 AU). Its orbit has an unusually high eccentricity of 0.83 and an inclination of 9° with respect to the ecliptic. It is also a Mercury-, Venus- and Mars-crosser, reaching its furthest point from the Sun in the outer asteroid belt. The body's observation arc begins at Steward Observatory's Catalina Station with its first observation in April 2018.

Close encounters 

2018 flyby 

 was first observed on 14 April 2018, at 09:23 UT by astronomers at Steward Observatory's Catalina Station, Arizona, the day prior to its close encounter with Earth.

It had been more than 120 degrees from the Sun since March 2018, but was simply too far and too faint to be detected by automated surveys. Despite coming from directly away from the Sun, it was not discovered until 14 April 2018, only one day prior to its closest approach. If the most advanced survey telescopes had been looking at its location, it could have been discovered as early as 30 March. The object also approached the Moon at an even closer distance of  a few hours later, at 09:59 UT.

It was the 32nd known asteroid to flyby Earth within 1 lunar distance (LD) since the start of 2018 and 16th closest, although it was the largest known asteroid to pass within half a lunar distance. After closest approach its apparent magnitude dropped from 12 to 35 in less than 12 hours, heading towards the Sun. Coming from the opposite direction, it would have been impossible to observe before its approach. A preliminary analysis of the orbit of  shows that this is the closest this particular asteroid has come to Earth since at least 1930.

Historical close encounters 

(H=20.7) may have also passed closer in 2001, although the distance of its approach is very uncertain and it was not discovered until 2017.

Physical characteristics

Diameter and albedo 

The diameter can only be estimated based on the brightness and distance. The albedo is currently unknown.

This asteroid is about three to six times the diameter of the meteor that exploded in the skies above Chelyabinsk, Russia in February 2013, which damaged over 7,200 buildings and injured 1,500 people, mostly from flying glass. If an asteroid of this size were to enter Earth's atmosphere, a good portion of it would likely disintegrate due to friction with the air. The remnants could survive entry however and impact the surface, thus causing regional damage dependent on various factors such as composition, speed, entry angle, and location of impact.

Rotation period 

As of 2018, no rotational lightcurve of  has been obtained from photometric observations. The body's rotation period, pole and shape remain unknown.

Numbering and naming 

This minor planet has neither been numbered nor named.

See also 
 List of asteroid close approaches to Earth
 List of asteroid close approaches to Earth in 2018
 2018 AH, a slightly larger asteroid that also passed unusually close to Earth in 2018.

Notes

References

External links 
 Asteroid 2018 GE3 flew past Earth at 0.5 LD, The Watchers, 16 April 2018
 "Tunguska"-Size Asteroid Makes Surprise Flyby of Earth, www.space.com, 16 April 2018
 Asteroid as big as a warehouse is freakiest near miss in years, www.cnet.com, 16 April 2018
 List Of Apollo Minor Planets (by designation), Minor Planet Center
 Asteroid Lightcurve Database (LCDB), query form (info )
 
 
 

Minor planet object articles (unnumbered)
Discoveries by the Catalina Sky Survey
Near-Earth objects in 2018
20180414